Hyperia macrocephala is a species of zooplankton, an amphipod in the family Hyperiidae.

Etymology
The name Hyperia macrocephala comes from the Latin "large head".

Description
This species can grow to 29 mm. The head of Hyperia macrocephala is shorter than the combined length of the first two pereonites. Specimens that are large and mature have CX IV that are pointed and laterally projecting. The P III-IV have many short, non-uniform setae on ART 5 and 6. The P V-VII are naked, and have a short cluster of setae apparently on only on the anterodistal margins of ART 2 of P V and VII. There are sharply pointed posterodistal corners on the epimeral plates. There is a strongly convex shape to the posterior margin of the epimera III. The UR is quite thin, the telson being fairly short in length.

Distribution
This species is found in the South Atlantic Ocean and around almost the entire coast of the Antarctic Ocean.

References

External links
 Illustration
 Illustrations and distribution diagrams around page 16

Hyperiidea
Crustaceans described in 1853